732 ESFS/Detachment 3 and 732 ESFS/Detachment 2 was a United States Air Force Security Forces unit sent to support Police Transition Teams in Baghdad, Iraq from 2005 until July 31, 2010. It was a "Request for Forces" (RFF) #619 or "In Lieu Of" agreement between the United States Air Force and United States Army. Rff 619 earned multiple unit awards and its members receiving individual awards as the Army Combat Action Badge, Air Force Combat Action Medal, Purple Heart, and the Bronze Star. The 732 ESFS is one of the most highly decorated and regarded Air Force units that participated in OIF.

Organization 

RFF 619 is the 732nd Expeditionary Security Forces. The 732nd ESFS was part of the 732nd Air Expeditionary Group under the 332nd Air Expeditionary Wing, headquartered at Balad Air Base, Iraq.
Det-3 was a subordinate unit of the 1-1 Cavalry and the 336 MP Battalion. In January 2009, Detachment 2 was formed and deployed to join the PTT efforts in Iraq. They were based initially at FOB Mahmudiyah in the middle of the "Triangle of Death." Det 1, 4, and 5 were tasked with Law & Order missions on their respective FOBs at Speicher, the IZ, and Adder/Tallil. Det 6 was a Police Transition Team located at COB Speicher attached to the 97 MP Company part of the 25th ID, 89th Brigade.  Detachment 6 was co-located with the 128th MP Company.   A separate unit was tasked with Law Enforcement Detachment.  732nd ESFS MWD Handlers were assigned to Army units at FOBs throughout the AOR. The 732 ESFS Det 6 was also stationed at the MPSA (Mosul Public Safety Academy) Mosul Iraq from Dec 2005 to June 2006. and conducted In Lieu of missions for the U.S. Army.

Mission 
Performs combat patrols to Iraqi Police stations. Trains, mentors and coaches the Iraqi Police in arguably Baghdad's worst districts to include Al Rashid, Karadah, Kadhimiya, Mansour, Abu Ghraib, (Mahmudiyah) and (Lutifyah). Its main objective is to restore faith and legitimacy to the Iraqi Police. Det-3/Det-2 has also performed Protective Services Detail for high-ranking Army, Air Force, and civilian officials into such cities as Ramadi and Fallujah.

History 

When deployed in June 2006, RFF 619 was renamed 732nd Expeditionary Security Forces Squadron's Detachment 7.
A majority of the members and the core leadership originated from the 824th Security Forces Squadron, Moody AFB, Georgia. Other airmen from 204th Security Forces Squadron El Paso, Texas and the 23rd Security Forces Squadron, Moody AFB augmented the 824th SFS. In Nov 2006, Security Forces volunteers from over 65 different bases relieved the 824th Security Forces Squadron. Shortly thereafter, the Air Force redesignated Det-7 as Det-3. This unit (call sign: Wildcards) would become the very first year-long PTT tour conducted by Security Forces. Det-3 would be assigned to the 92nd MP Battalion deployed to Camp Liberty in Baghdad. In September 2007, a multimillion-dollar compound was constructed on Sather Air Base. It would be named "Camp Defender" in honor of fallen members A1C Lee Bernard Chavis and SSgt John T. Self. The area contains living quarters, a Base defense operations center, Armory, and a motor pool. In early 2008 Det-3 Shadow Company was relocated to Forward Operating Base Falcon, Baghdad Iraq.

Det 2 started in 2009 and relieved Army MP's at FOB Mahmudiyah(St. Michael previously named), which was located south of Det 3/Camp Falcon. This location was a connection of the cities known before/during the Iraq surge as the Triangle of Death, cities included Mahmudiyah, Latifya, Yusufiya. After 8 months Det 2 completed their mission in the triangle and in August 2009 was reassigned to Camp Stryker(Victory Base Complex) and conduct the same mission into the Abu Ghraib and southern Baghdad.

Det 3 runs missions from several camps, forward operating bases, and joint security stations around Baghdad. The "Praetorian" detachment of 2010 was one of the hardest working detachments and was awarded more medals than any other Air Force team before them, but they were not without fault. There had been several incidents of negligence, aggravated assault, and the relief of a detachment officer for misconduct.

Det 3 was inactivated on July 3, 2010 at Camp Taji. 732 ESFS, Det 2 was officially "Off Mission" and relieved of duty on 26 July 2010 by the Army's 94th MP Company at Camp Stryker, Iraq.

W.I.A and K.I.A 

On September 22, 2006 Airman 1st Class Jeremy Birchfield an 824th Security Forces Squadron turret gunner was hit by a sniper during patrol operations. He was presented with the Purple Heart at Camp Victory, Iraq Sept. 24, 2006.

On October 14, 2006, A1C Lee Bernard Chavis was killed by small arms fire in the Karadah District of Baghdad. A1C Chavis was mortally wounded while securing the site of a suspected improvised explosive device. A1C Chavis was awarded the Bronze Star and Purple Heart posthumously.

On April 15, 2007, SSgt Scott Lilley was injured when the team he was with was attacked by insurgents and his vehicle hit by an Improvised Explosive Device (IED).

On April 25, 2007, Wildcard 2-1, Charlie vehicle, was struck by an IED while traveling down route Ash where local national interpreter Ahmed was critically wounded and A1C Jonathan Higgins sustained minor burn injuries, and was later diagnosed with a Traumatic Brain Injury. A1C Higgins received the Purple Heart medal and Air Force Combat Action Medal in February 2008.

On May 14, 2007, SSgt John T. Self was killed and three airmen were wounded. SrA Joshua Brooks and SrA Melanie Manley sustained critical injuries, and SSgt Brian Breen sustained minor injuries when an IED hit the Humvee they were traveling in the Al Rashid district of Baghdad. The Squad was traveling down route Vernon and had just passed route Steelers en route back to the VBC complex when their Humvee was struck by an IED.

On June 23, 2007, A1C Jason  D. Nathan was killed when an IED was detonated near his vehicle in Tikrit.

On July 3, 2007, Wildcard 1–3; SSgt Daniel Peña, SrA Lawrence Taylor and SrA Mark Brown, were injured when their vehicle was hit by an IED. The squad was traveling on Route Vernon and was en route to Al Bayaa, Baghdad Police Station in the Al Rashid district.

On April 3, 2008, SSgt Travis Griffin was killed by an IED that detonated near his vehicle while on patrol. SrA Tony Maffei, SrA Joseph Ronchetto, and Spc. Curtis Worthy were also injured in the blast.

On September 8, 2009, 1st Lt Joseph D. Helton was killed when an IED hit the Humvee he was traveling in the Al Rashid district of Baghdad.  He was the first KIA for Det 2 after previously serving 9 months as a Flight Commander for Det 3.  Also WIA were SrA Victor Wise and SrA Jon Gally.

On September 15, 2009, SrA Philip Newlyn, A1C Eddy Kelley and SSgt Justin Stubbs were injured after an IED hit their Humvee while traveling in the
Al Rashid district of Baghdad.

Unit names 
 2005-2006 “Sheriff of Baghdad” Det 2/3
 2006 "Ghostwalkers" Det 3
 2006–2007 "Wildcards" Det 3
 2007–2008 "Shadows" Det 3
 2007–2008 "Outlaws" Det 6
 2008–2009 "Renegades" Det 3
 2009-2010 "Roughriders" Det 2
 2009–2010 "Praetorians" Det 3 also known as "Paintorians"
 2010–2010 "Reapers" Det 2

In Media 
In August 2006, a Det-3 M1114 turret shield was found utilizing what now has become the infamous slogan "Iraqi Photo's". The picture has made its way through email and various humor sites.

The Valdosta, Georgia based band "Killed by the Clue Knife" wrote the song entitled "Doc Schrope and His Long Hair" about an Air Force medic from Det-7.

In Sept 2006 several music videos were released depicting Det-7 in Baghdad. The videos were posted on Myspace and YouTube and are also shown at the 343rd Training Squadron.

In honor of SSgt. Travis Griffin, a workout was established on the popular exercise site Crossfit.

See also 
 Operation Together Forward
 Iraq War troop surge of 2007

References

External links 

 Security forces Airmen help shape Iraq's future Air Force News (Jan 4, 2007)
 New combat turret design named for fallen Airman Air Force News (Dec 9, 2007)
 Farewell on a Dark Tarmac Washington Post (Oct 18, 2007)
 Faces of Fallen Washington Post
 RFF 619 Videos on YouTube

2006 in Iraq
Expeditionary Security Forces Squadron (732)